Love Notes is a studio album by American country artist Janie Fricke. It was released in March 1979 via Columbia Records and contained ten tracks. It was the second album released in Fricke's music career and included three singles that charted in both the United States and Canada. The album was met with favorable reviews from writers and critics.

Background and content
Janie Fricke would eventually have a string of top ten and number one country singles during the 1980s. Prior to that, she first signed a recording contract with Columbia Records after working as a background singer in Nashville, Tennessee. Her first Columbia single nearly reached the top 20 in 1977 called "What're You Doing Tonight". She would continue releasing music during this period including 1979's Love Notes. Fricke recorded the album in two sessions between August and December 1978. Sessions were held at the Columbia Studio in Nashville and she was produced by Billy Sherrill. The album was a collection of ten tracks. It included Fricke's self-composed track "River Blue". It also included a cover of Ann Cole's "Got My Mojo Working" and a track written by Billy Sherrill called "Let Me Love You Goodbye".

Release, reception and singles

Love Notes was originally released in March 1979 on Columbia Records. It was originally offered as a vinyl LP, containing five tracks on either side of the record. It was later available to digital and streaming platforms, including Apple Music. The disc was Fricke's second studio album issued in her recording career and her second with Columbia. The album was met with a favorable review from Billboard magazine in 1979 who highlighted its eclectic mix of traditional country and country pop. Critics also praised her vocal ability and phrasing. The disc was also given three out of five stars from AllMusic.

Three singles were spawned from Love Notes. The first was "Playin' Hard to Get", which was released in October 1978. The song peaked at number 22 on the American Billboard Hot Country Songs chart after 22 weeks. "I'll Love Away Your Troubles for Awhile" was released as a single in February 1979. It became the highest-peaking single from the record, reaching number 14 on the Billboard country chart. The third and final single was "Let's Try Again", which was released in June 1979. The single peaked at number 28 on the Billboard country survey. All three singles also reached the Canadian RPM Country Songs chart. "I'll Love Your Troubles Away for Awhile" became the biggest hit of the singles in Canada, peaking at number four on the chart in 1979.

Track listings

Vinyl version

Digital version

Personnel
All credits are adapted from the liner notes of Love Notes.

Technical personnel
 Lou Bradley – engineer
 Bill Justis – arrangement
 Norman Seeff – photography
 Billy Sherrill – producer
 Virginia Team – art direction

Release history

References

1979 albums
Albums produced by Billy Sherrill
Columbia Records albums
Janie Fricke albums